Taftafineh Shams Ali (also Romanized as Tāftāfīneh Shams ʿAlī; also known as Tāftāfīneh) is a village in Teshkan Rural District, Chegeni District, Dowreh County, Lorestan Province, Iran. At the 2006 census, its population was 223, in 46 families.

References 

Towns and villages in Dowreh County